Robert Ellerslie Davis, Jr. (born September 15, 1945) is a former American collegiate and Professional Football quarterback. He played at the University of Virginia. Davis played professionally for the American Football League's Houston Oilers, for the NFL's New York Jets and New Orleans Saints, and in the World Football League in 1974 and 1975 for the Florida Blazers and the Philadelphia Bell. 1974 was his best season as he completed 232 of 413 passes for 2977 yards with 21 touchdowns and 23 interceptions.

Davis played high school football at Neptune High School.

Davis was a resident of the Wayside section of Ocean Township, Monmouth County, New Jersey.

See also
Other American Football League players

References

1945 births
Living people
American football quarterbacks
Florida Blazers players
Houston Oilers players
New York Jets players
New Orleans Saints players
Neptune High School alumni
University of Virginia alumni
Sportspeople from Long Branch, New Jersey
People from Ocean Township, Monmouth County, New Jersey
Players of American football from New Jersey
Virginia Cavaliers football players
American Football League players
Sportspeople from Monmouth County, New Jersey